Bacchisa pseudobasalis is a species of beetle in the family Cerambycidae. It was described by Breuning in 1956. It is known from Myanmar.

References

P
Beetles described in 1956